The Charleston Hotel is an historic hotel in the City of Lake Charles in the U.S. state of Louisiana. It is located at 900 Ryan Street, at the corner with West Pujo Street.

The building was added to the National Register of Historic Places May 27, 1982.

History 
The hotel initial proposal contained eight stories but when work began in 1928 this was increased to ten floors.  The estimated cost increased $50,000 to $600,000, and the hotel was completed in 1929, during the administration of Mayor Henry J. Geary.

When completed the building was the city's first skyscraper. The bottom two stories were faced with cement molded to resemble cut stone blocks and the upper eight stories were faced with tan brick in the Neo-Classical Beaux Arts style. It is topped by a stone cornice and some windows on the top story are surrounded by pilasters and elaborate spandrel panels.  The interior of the building has a two-story lobby, elaborate tile work, and balconies on the upper level. The Charleston Ballroom, located on the second floor, has Corinthian pilasters and weekly dances were held on the open roof garden.

Current 
As of 2014, the structure has undergone extensive renovation with rooms converted into shops with event space throughout the building.

See also 
National Register of Historic Places listings in Calcasieu Parish, Louisiana
Lake Charles, Louisiana

References 

Hotel buildings on the National Register of Historic Places in Louisiana
Hotel buildings completed in 1929
Buildings and structures in Lake Charles, Louisiana
National Register of Historic Places in Calcasieu Parish, Louisiana